Chrysocatharylla oenescentellus is a moth in the family Crambidae. It was described by George Hampson in 1896. It is found in Kenya, Mozambique, South Africa and India.

References

Moths described in 1896
Moths of Africa
Moths of Asia